The Department of Finance is a department of the Government of Ireland. It is led by the Minister for Finance and is assisted by two Minister of State.

The Department of Finance is responsible for the administration of the public finances of the Republic of Ireland and all powers, duties and functions connected with the same, including in particular, the collection and expenditure of the revenues of Ireland from whatever source arising.

Departmental team
Minister for Finance: Michael McGrath, TD
Minister of State at the Department of Finance with responsibility for Financial Services, Credit Unions and Insurance: Seán Fleming, TD
Secretary General of the Department: John Hogan

Overview
The official headquarters and ministerial offices of the department are in Government Buildings, Merrion Street, Dublin. The Department of Finance has a central role in implementing Irish Government policy, in particular the Programme for Government, and in advising and supporting the Minister for Finance and the Government on the economic and financial management of the State and the overall management and development of the public sector.

There are nine divisions within the Department of Finance:
Shareholding and Financial Advisory Division
Tax Division
Economic Division
Financial Services Division with responsibility for Legal Unit
EU and International Division
Human Resources Division
International Finance and Climate Division
Banking Division
Corporate Affairs with responsibility for the Finance unit and FMU

History
There was a Ministry of Finance in the Ministry of Dáil Éireann of the Irish Republic established on 22 January 1919. It was provided a statutory basis by the Ministers and Secretaries Act 1924, passed soon after the establishment of the Irish Free State in 1922. This act provided it with:

The Schedule assigned it with the duties of the following bodies:
The business and functions formerly administered, and discharged by the British Treasury in Ireland.
The Revenue Commissioners.
The Paymaster General and Deputy Paymaster for Ireland.
The Government Actuary.
The Commissioners of Public Works in Ireland.
The Civil Service Commission.
The Commissioner of Valuation and Boundary Surveyor for Ireland.
The Ordnance Survey.
The Superintendent of the Teachers' Pension Office.
The Stationery Office.
The Old Age Pensions, save as regards appeals governed by Statute.
The Post Office Savings Bank (administered through the Minister for Posts and Telegraphs as agent).
The Registrar of Friendly Societies.

The Department of Finance has retained its title since its establishment. In 1973, its public service functions were transferred to the new Department of the Public Service. Until 1980, the position of the Minister for the Public Service was required by law to be assigned to the Minister for Finance. In 1987, these functions were transferred back to the Department of Finance.

In 1980, the functions of the Department of Economic Planning were transferred to the Department of Finance. These functions are principally to promote and co-ordinate economic and social planning, including sectoral and regional planning, to identify development policies, to review the methods adopted by departments of state to implement such policies and generally to advise the government on economic and social planning matters.

In July 2011, the Department of Public Expenditure and Reform was established, and a considerable number of the functions of the Department of Finance were transferred to that department.

Secretaries of the Department

See also
Office of Public Works
Revenue Commissioners
Irish Fiscal Advisory Council
Green Jersey Agenda
Ireland as a tax haven

References

External links
Department of Finance
Structure of the Department

 
1919 establishments in Ireland
Finance
Ireland
Economy of the Republic of Ireland
Ireland, Finance